was a village located in Usu District, Iburi Subprefecture, Hokkaido, Japan.

As of 2004, the village had an estimated population of 2,054 and a density of 7.50 persons per km2. The total area was 274.03 km2.

On 1 March 2006, Ōtaki was merged into the city of Date.

Climate

References

External links
 Date official website 

Dissolved municipalities of Hokkaido